The Oregon Trail 5th Edition: Adventures Along the Oregon Trail is a 2001 video game, and the sequel to The Oregon Trail 4th Edition.

Gameplay
The game design is based on Oregon Trail II, but adds various new features to the game. The plant gathering feature was carried over from the 3rd and 4th editions. The "Wild Fruits and Vegetables" event from Oregon Trail II is removed. This feature involves identifying which plants are edible and which are poisonous. Incidentally, the option to "go look for edible plants" whenever someone is diagnosed with scurvy was kept. The player can also go fishing. Updated graphics have been provided for river crossings. There are also added animated segments which follow the fictional journey of the three Montgomery children, Parker, Cassie, and Jimmy, who leave Independence accompanied by an African American trailblazer named Captain Jed Freedman to search for the children's father in Oregon. Various points of the children's story are triggered when the player reaches a certain destination on the trail, which ranges from dangerous experiences (e.g., Jimmy is bitten by a snake) to campfire scenes in which Captain Jed would tell a story that reflects other historically accurate incidents (such as the Donner Party, the California Gold Rush, and the Santa Fe Trail). The conversation pictures are no longer animated. The soundtrack of Oregon Trail II has also been removed, replaced with a single repeating audio loop.

External links
 Broderbund (Riverdeep Interactive Learning Limited) page: The Oregon Trail 5th Edition, Oregon Trail 5th Edition v 1.0 support, Oregon Trail 5 (RNV) support, Oregon Trail 5th Edition EEV (ATS) support, Oregon Trail 5th Edition EEV (School Edition) support
 Selectsoft page: Oregon Trail 5th Edition
 

2001 video games
Children's educational video games
The Learning Company games
Classic Mac OS games
The Oregon Trail (series)
Video games developed in the United States
Windows games